was a Japanese actor and voice actor from Kagoshima Prefecture affiliated with Engekishūdan En.

Formerly affiliated with Gekidan Haiyūza, Arikawa enrolled in Gekidan Kumo in 1965. It wasn't until 1975 that Arikawa would enroll in Engekishūdan En. On October 16, 2011 he died of acute respiratory failure.

Filmography

Film 
Hibotan bakuto: Tekkaba retsuden (1969)
Seito Shokun! (1984)
Early Spring Story (1985)
Matamata abunai deka (1988)
Hashire! Shiroi okami (1990) - Cal (voice)
Sharaku (1995) - Tsuruya Kiemon
Berserk: The Golden Age Arc (2012) - Hassan (voice) (final film role)

Television drama 
 Fuun Lion-Maru (1973) - Koreshinji Tamakage
 Shinsengumi (1973) - Okita Sōji
 Mito Kōmon (1975–2010) - Kudō Shinpachirō, Kyōnosuke Tachibana, Abe Masatake, etc.
 Hissatsu Shōbainin (1978) - Sakaguchi
 Tokugawa Ieyasu (1983) - Ōtani Yoshitsugu
 Haru no Hatō (1985) - Uchimura Kanzō
 Sanada Taiheiki (1985–1986) - Doi Toshikatsu
 Choujinki Metalder (1987) - Shinware Kōki
 Dokuganryū Masamune (1987) - Shinjō Danjō
 Bayside Shakedown (1997) - First District Police Headquarters Manager
 Seijuu Sentai Gingaman (1998) - Elder Ōgi

Theater 
 Romeo and Juliet (1970) (Romeo)
 Hamlet (1983) (Horatio)
 My Fair Lady (1990) (Colonel Pickering)
 'Tis Pity She's a Whore (2006) (Donado)

Television animation 
 Georgie! (1983) (Skiffins)
 Monster (2004) (Richard Braun)
 Ergo Proxy (2006) (Hoody)
 Kenichi: The Mightiest Disciple (2006) (Hayato Fūrinji)
 Shōnen Onmyōji (2006) (Tenkū)
 Tegami Bachi (2009) (Narrator)
 Bunny Drop (2011) (Sōichi Kaga)

Theatrical animation 
 Eden of the East: Paradise Lost (2010) (Saizo Ato/Mr. Outside)
 Berserk: The Golden Age Arc I - The Egg of the King (2012) (Hassan)

Video games 
Glass Rose (2003) (Denemon Yoshinodou)
Kingdom Hearts Birth by Sleep (2010) (Merlin)

Dubbing roles

Live-action
Ian McKellen
The Lord of the Rings: The Fellowship of the Ring (Gandalf)
The Lord of the Rings: The Two Towers (Gandalf)
The Lord of the Rings: The Return of the King (Gandalf)
X2 (Magneto)
X-Men: The Last Stand (Magneto)
20,000 Leagues Under the Sea (2002 NHK-BS2 edition) (Captain Nemo (Michael Caine))
The Avengers (Sir August De Wynter (Sean Connery))
Bad Company (Officer Oakes (Anthony Hopkins))
The Big Lebowski (VHS/DVD edition) (Jeffrey "The Big" Lebowski (David Huddleston))
The Chorus (Pierre Morhange (Jacques Perrin))
Columbo (Patrick McGoohan)
Die Hard (1990 TV Asahi edition) (Hans Gruber (Alan Rickman))
Dreamer (Pop Crane (Kris Kristofferson))
ER (Doctor Carl Vucelich (Ron Rifkin))
Executive Decision (1999 TV Asahi edition) (Nagi Hassan (David Suchet))
Fair Game (Colonel Ilya Kazak (Steven Berkoff))
Hard to Kill (1994 TV Asahi edition) (Senator Vernon Trent (William Sadler))
The Incredible Hulk (David Banner (Bill Bixby))
Knight Rider (Michael Knight (David Hasselhoff))
L.A. Confidential (Capt. Dudley Smith (James Cromwell))
The Lake House (Simon J. Wyler (Christopher Plummer))
Little Voice (Ray Say (Michael Caine))
The Mask of Zorro (Don Rafael Montero (Stuart Wilson))
Misery (Paul Sheldon (James Caan))
The Missing (Samuel Jones / Chaa-duu-ba-its-iidan (Tommy Lee Jones))
Mission: Impossible 2 (2006 TV Asahi edition) (Mission Commander Swanbeck (Anthony Hopkins))
Presumed Innocent (Alejandro "Sandy" Stern (Raul Julia))
Super Mario Bros. (1994 NTV edition) (President Koopa (Dennis Hopper))
Terrahawks (Tiger Ninestein)
True Grit (Rooster Cogburn (Jeff Bridges))

Animation
Flushed Away (The Toad)
Pocahontas (Governor Ratcliffe)
Pocahontas II: Journey to a New World (Governor Ratcliffe)
Ratatouille (Gusteau)

References

External links
 

1940 births
2011 deaths
Japanese male film actors
Japanese male stage actors
Japanese male television actors
Japanese male video game actors
Japanese male voice actors
People from Komae, Tokyo
Male voice actors from Tokyo Metropolis
Male voice actors from Kagoshima Prefecture
20th-century Japanese male actors
21st-century Japanese male actors